Harvey is an unincorporated community in Scott County, Arkansas, United States. Harvey has a post office with ZIP code 72841.

History
A post office has been in operation at Harvey since 1893.

Notable person
State Representative Marcus Richmond, a Republican who took office in 2015, resides in Harvey.

References

Unincorporated communities in Scott County, Arkansas
Unincorporated communities in Arkansas